Forced Witness is the second studio album by Australian musician Alex Cameron. It was released by record label Secretly Canadian on 8 September 2017, and includes songs featuring Brandon Flowers and Angel Olsen. The album is defined by Cameron's characteristic 1980s instrumentation and first-person storytelling. It received moderately positive reviews from critics.

Track listing

Personnel 
 
Performance
 Alex Cameron - primary vocals, drums and percussion (1, 2, 3, 10), Korg M1 (9).
 Roy Molloy - saxophone
 Angel Olsen - featured artist
Production
 Jonathan Rado - producer, engineering
 Brandon Flowers - engineering, featured artist
 Joel Ford - additional production, engineering
 Jacknife Lee - additional production, engineering
 Robert Root - engineering
 Marta Salogni - mixing
 Richard Swift - mixing
 Jacob Portrait - mixing
 Christian Bader - mixing
 
Design
 Bryan McLeod - design
 Nathaniel David Utesch - design
 Britt McCamey - photography

References 

2017 albums
Alex Cameron (musician) albums
Secretly Canadian albums
Albums produced by Jonathan Rado